The 2003 Baghdad Championship, commonly referred to as the 2003 Iraqi Elite Cup, was the thirteenth occurrence of the Iraqi Elite Cup, organised by the Iraq Football Association, and the first since it was renamed from Mother of all Battles Championship to Baghdad Championship. The top eight teams in the league table at the end of round 27 of the cancelled 2002–03 Iraqi First Division competed in the tournament.

The competition started on 1 October 2003, with the third place match being cancelled and the final being postponed to 5 January 2004 for security reasons due to crowd trouble that occurred in the semi-finals. In the final, held at Al-Zawraa Stadium, Al-Zawraa defeated Al-Talaba 5–4 on penalties after a 2–2 draw that saw three red cards. This turned out to be the last ever edition of the Iraqi Elite Cup.

Group stage

Group 1

Group 2

Semifinals

Final

Awards

References

External links
 Iraqi Football Website

2003–04 in Iraqi football
Football competitions in Iraq